Upper Norrland Military District (Milo ÖN), originally VI Military District was a Swedish military district, a command of the Swedish Armed Forces that had operational control over Upper Norrland, for most time of its existence corresponding to the area covered by the counties of Västerbotten and Norrbotten. The headquarters of Milo ÖN were located in Boden.

History 
Milo ÖN was created in 1966 along with five other military districts as part of a reorganisation of the administrative divisions of the Swedish Armed Forces. It can be seen as the successor of VI Military District (VI. militärområdet) created in 1942, but that did not have the same tasks as Milo ÖN. The military district consisted of the land covered by the above-mentioned counties. In 1993, the number of military districts of Sweden was decreased to three, and as a consequence of that, Milo ÖN was merged with the Lower Norrland Military District (Milo NN) to create a new military district, the Northern Military District (Milo N).

Units 1989
In peacetime the Upper Norrland Military District consisted of the following units, which were training recruits for wartime units:

 Upper Norrland Military District (Milo ÖN), in Boden
 Army units:
 K 4 - Norrland Dragoon Regiment, in Arvidsjaur, training Norrlandsjägare ("Norrland Rangers")
 I 19/P 5 - Norrbotten Regiment with Norrbotten Armoured Battalion, in Boden
 I 20/Fo 61 - Västerbotten Regiment / Västerbotten Defense District in Umeå
 I 22/Fo 66 - Lapland Ranger Regiment / Kiruna Defense District, in Kiruna
 A 8/Fo 63 - Boden Artillery Regiment / Boden Defense District, in Boden
 Ing 3 - Boden Engineer Regiment, in Boden
 S 3 - Norrland Signal Regiment, in Boden
 Lv 7 - Luleå Air Defence Regiment, in Luleå
 AF 1 - Norrbotten Army Aviation Battalion, at Boden Helicopter Airfield, with Bell 204C and Bell 206A utility helicopters, and one squadron of 10x Bo 105CB3 anti-tank helicopters
 Fo 67 - Kalix Defense District, in Kalix
 Boden Fortress
 Air Force units:
 F 21/Se ÖN - Norrbotten Wing / Air Defense Sector Upper Norrland, in Luleå
 211th Recce Squadron, with SF 37 Viggen photo reconnaissance aircraft and SH 37 Viggen maritime reconnaissance/strike aircraft
 212th Fighter Squadron, with JA 37 Viggen fighter aircraft
 213th Fighter Squadron, with JA 37 Viggen fighter aircraft

In wartime the Upper Norrland Military District would have activated the following major land units, as well as a host of smaller units:
 15th Division, in Boden
 NB 19 - Norrbotten Brigade, a Type 85 Norrland Brigade (optimized for arctic/winter warfare) based on the I 19/P 5 - Norrbotten Regiment
 NB 50 - Lapland Brigade, a Type 85 Norrland Brigade based on the I 20 - Västerbotten Regiment
 8x Norrland Jäger battalions
 3x Self-propelled Artillery Battalions, with 8x Bandkanon 1 each

Heraldry and traditions

Coat of arms
The coat of arms of the Upper Norrland Military District Staff 1983–1993. Blazon: "Azur, an erect sword with the district letter (ÖN - Upper Norrland) surrounded by an open chaplet of oak leaves, all or."

Commanding officers

Military commanders

1942–1946: Nils Rosenblad
1946–1951: Sven Colliander
1951–1963: Nils Björk
1963–1963: Karl Gustaf Brandberg (acting)
1963–1972: Arne Mohlin
1972–1976: Nils Personne
1976–1980: Karl-Gösta Lundmark
1980–1984: Erik G. Bengtsson
1984–1986: Bengt Gustafsson
1986–1988: Lars-Erik Englund
1988–1990: Åke Sagrén
1990–1992: Curt Sjöö
1992–1993: Carl-Ivar Pesula

Chiefs of Staff

1942–1944: Holger Stenholm
1944–1948: Arne Hallström
1948–1949: Sten Langéen
1949–1954: Carl Gustaf Dahlberg
1954–1958: Bror von Vegesack
1958–1963: Gunnar Henricson
1963–1966: Bele Jansson
1966–1972: Nils Personne
1972–1974: Gösta Hökmark
1974–1976: Karl-Gösta Lundmark
1976–1977: Bengt Schuback
1977–1978: Erik Nygren
1978–1980: Evert Båge
1980–1983: Bertil Nordström
1983–1986: Lars-Erik Englund
1986–1988: Åke Sagrén
1988–1992: Carl-Johan Rundberg
1992–1993: Tomas Warming

Names, designations and locations

See also
Military district (Sweden)

References

Notes

Print

Web

Military districts of Sweden
Disbanded units and formations of Sweden
Military units and formations established in 1942
Military units and formations disestablished in 1993
1942 establishments in Sweden
1993 disestablishments in Sweden
Boden Garrison